A bahuvrihi compound (from , originally referring to fertile land but later denoting the quality of being wealthy or rich) is a type of compound word that denotes a referent by specifying a certain characteristic or quality the referent possesses. A bahuvrihi is exocentric, so that the compound is not a hyponym of its head. For instance, a sabretooth (smil-odon) is neither a sabre nor a tooth, but a feline with sabre-like teeth. 

In Sanskrit bahuvrihis, the last constituent is a noun—more strictly, a nominal stem—while the whole compound is an adjective. In Vedic Sanskrit the accent is regularly on the first member (  "a king's son", but bahuvrihi  "having kings as sons" (lit. king-sons), viz. , m., "father of kings", f., "mother of kings"), with the exception of a number of non-nominal prefixes such as the privative a; the word  is itself likewise an exception to this rule.

Bahuvrihi compounds are called possessive compounds in English. In English, bahuvrihis can be identified and the last constituent is usually a noun, while the whole compound is a noun or an adjective. The accent is on the first constituent. English bahuvrihis often describe people using synecdoche: flatfoot, half-wit, highbrow, lowlife, redhead, tenderfoot, long-legs, and white-collar.

In dictionaries and other reference works, the abbreviation 'Bhvr.' is sometimes used to indicate bahuvrihi compounds.

Examples

English 
 "Houndstooth", a woven fabric with a patterns resembling dog's teeth: "She's wearing houndstooth."
 "Old money", members from established upper-class who have usually inherited their wealth: "He's definitely old money."
 "Bluestocking", an educated, intellectual, or artistically accomplished woman: "Auntie Maud will never marry; she's a bluestocking."

Other languages  

See also 

 Dvandva
 Dvigu
 Kenning
 Sanskrit compound
 Synecdoche

References

Linguistic morphology
Vyakarana